Margaret Aachilla Aleper (born 22 November 1963) is a Ugandan politician  and the district woman representative for Kotido district in Uganda's 10th Parliament. She is a member of the ruling National Resistance Movement party.

Background and education 
Margaret Aleper attended Primary Leaving Examination at Kotido Mixed Primary School in 1976. In 1980, she completed her Uganda Certificate of Education at Kangole Girls Senior Secondary School. She was awarded a certificate in Grade III Teaching at Moroto Teacher Training College/Makerere University in 1985. In 1997, she completed a Diploma in Teacher Education from Institute of Teacher Education, Kyambogo. She attained her bachelor's degree in education from Kyambogo University in 2004.

Career 
Her working history is detailed below:
2011 to date: member of Parliament, Parliament of Uganda. 
 1997-2006: deputy head teacher, Lomukura Primary School.
 2001-2006: monitoring assistant, Kotido District Local Government.
 1985-1996: education assistant, Kotido Mixed and Lomukura Primary School.

Other responsibilities 
She also serves as a full-time member under the Membership to Professional bodies at Uganda National Teachers Union.

Controversies  
She was tagged among the members of Parliament who betrayed Uganda. She was named one of the members of Parliament who voted "Yes" on the second reading of the Constitution Amendment Bill.

See also 
List of Members of the Ninth Parliament of Uganda
List of Members of the Tenth Parliament of Uganda
Kotido District
Moses Adome

External links 
 Website of the Parliament of Uganda

References

Living people
Kotido District
Women members of the Parliament of Uganda
National Resistance Movement politicians
Members of the Parliament of Uganda
1963 births
Kyambogo University alumni